Bokaro Institute of Technology is a private Engineering college located in Bokaro Steel City, Jharkhand. The college was established in 1982–83 and it is affiliated to Vinoba Bhave University. The college was opened by Chas-Bokaro Vikas Samiti, a well known social organization of Bokaro.

References 

Education in Bokaro Steel City
Educational institutions established in 1982
Engineering colleges in Jharkhand
1982 establishments in Bihar